Port Tobacco Historic District is a national historic district in Port Tobacco, Charles County, Maryland. It is located along both sides of Chapel Point Road immediately south of Maryland Route 6.  It includes five surviving 18th- and 19th-century buildings; four have been privately restored as single-family residences. The fifth was renovated for use as a children's museum. Two of these buildings, Chimney House and Stagg Hall (listed separately), are immediately adjacent to one another at one corner of the town square.

In 1972, the 1821–1892 courthouse was reconstructed on its original site for use as a museum of local history. Other buildings include several private residences built after 1940.  A brick wellhouse was erected in 1958 to commemorate the county's tercentenary. Approximately 90 percent of the historic features of the community constitute archeological sites, nearly all of which have remained undisturbed by later development.

It was added to the National Register of Historic Places in 1989.

Gallery

References

External links
, including photo dated 1988, at Maryland Historical Trust
Boundary Map of the Port Tobacco Historic District, Charles County, at Maryland Historical Trust

Historic districts in Charles County, Maryland
Historic districts on the National Register of Historic Places in Maryland
National Register of Historic Places in Charles County, Maryland